List of the published work of Robert Silverberg, American science fiction author.

Novels

Nidorian series:
The Shrouded Planet (with Randall Garrett, as Robert Randall) Gnome (1957), Mayflower-Dell (1963),  Starblaze (1981) , Ace (1982) 
The Dawning Light (with Randall Garrett, as Robert Randall) Gnome (1959), Mayflower-Dell (1963), Starblaze (1981) 0-89865-033-X, Ace (1982) 

Regan series:
 Regan's Planet Pyramid F-986 (1964)
 World's Fair 1992 Follett (1970), Ace (1982) 

Majipoor series:
 Lord Valentine Cycle:
 Lord Valentine's Castle Harper & Row (1980) , Bantam (1981) , Pan (1981) , Harper (1995) , Locus Award for Best Fantasy Novel winner, 1981; Hugo Award nominee, 1981
 Majipoor Chronicles Arbor House (1982) , Gollancz (1982) , Bantam (1983) , Pan (1983) , collection of 5 short stories and 5 novelettes/novellas:
 "Thesme and the Ghayrog" (novelette), "The Time of the Burning", "In the Fifth Year of the Voyage" (novelette), "Calintane Explains", "The Desert of Stolen Dreams" (novella), "The Soul Painter and the Shapeshifter" (novelette), "Crime and Punishment", "Among the Dream-Speakers", "A Thief in Ni-Moya" (novella), "Voriax and Valentine"
 Valentine Pontifex Arbor House (1983) , Gollancz (1983) , Bantam (1984) , Pan (1985) 
 The Mountains of Majipoor Bantam (1995) , Pan (1995) , Bantam (1996) 
 Lord Prestimion Cycle (prequel):
 Sorcerers of Majipoor Macmillan UK (1997) , HarperPrism (1997) , Pan (1997) , HarperPrism (1998) 
 Lord Prestimion Harper (1999) , Eos (2000) 
 The King of Dreams Voyager (2001) , Eos (2001) 
 Tales of Majipoor Gollancz (2013) , Roc (2013) , collection of 7  novelettes/novellas:
 "The End of the Line" (novelette), "The Book of Changes" (novella), "The Tomb of the Pontifex Dvorn" (novelette), "The Sorcerer's Apprentice" (novelette), "Dark Times at the Midnight Market" (novelette), "The Way They Wove the Spells in Sippulgar" (novelette), "The Seventh Shrine" (novella)

Gilgamesh series:
 Gilgamesh the King Arbor House (1984) , Bantam (1985) , Pan (1986) , ibooks (2005) 
 To the Land of the Living Popular Questar (1989) , Bison (2005) 

New Springtime series:
 At Winter's End Warner (1988) , Bison (2005) 
 The New Springtime Warner (1990)  (aka The Queen of Springtime)
 Related story:
 A Piece of the Great World (2005), novella 

Stand-alones:
Revolt on Alpha C Thomas Crowell (1955) 
The 13th Immortal Ace D-223 (1957) 
Master of Life and Death Ace D-237 (1957) ,  Avon S369 (1968), Tor (1986) 
Invaders from Earth Ace D-286 (1958), Avon S365 (1968),  Panther (1979), Ace (1980) , Tor (1987) 
Lest We Forget Thee, Earth Ace D-291 (1958) (as Calvin M. Knox) , 
Stepsons of Terra Ace D-311 (1958), Ace (1977), Ace (1983) 
Aliens from Space (1958) (as David Osborne)
Invisible Barriers (1958) (as David Osborne)
Starhaven Avalon (1958) (as Ivar Jorgenson)
Starman's Quest Gnome (1958)
The Plot Against Earth Ace (1959) (as Calvin M. Knox)
The Planet Killers Ace D-407 (1959) 
Lost Race of Mars Scholastic (1960)
Collision Course Avalon (1961), Ace F123 (1961), Ace (1977), Ace (1982) , Tor (1988) 
The Seed of Earth Ace F-145 (1962), Ace (1982) 
Recalled to Life Lancer (1962), revised version Doubleday (1972) , Panther (1975) ,  Ace (1977) 
Blood on the Mink (written in 1959, first published in 1962 as "Too Much Blood on the Mink" in Trapped magazine, re-published in 2012 by Hard Case Crime)
The Silent Invaders Ace F-195 (1963), Ace (1973), Tor (1985) 
Time of the Great Freeze Holt, Rinehart and Winston (1964), Dell (1966), Tor (1988) 
One of Our Asteroids is Missing (1964, as Calvin M. Knox)
Conquerors from the Darkness  Holt, Rinehart and Winston (1965), Dell 1456 (1968), Ace (1979) , Tor (1986) 
The Gate of Worlds Holt, Rinehart and Winston (1967), Magnum (1980), Tor (1984) , Tor (1991) , ibooks (2005) 
Planet of Death (1967), novella
Thorns  Ballantine U6097 (1967) , Bantam (1983) , Futura (1987) , Gollancz (2000) . Nebula Award nominee, 1967; Hugo Award nominee, 1968
Those Who Watch Signet P3160 (1967), New English Library (1977) 
The Time Hoppers Doubleday (1967), Avon S372 (1968), Tandem (1970), Leisure (1977) , Ace (1982) 
To Open the Sky Ballantine U6093 (1967), Sphere (1970) , Ballantine (1970) ,  Berkley (1978) , Bantam (1984)  
Hawksbill Station Doubleday (1968), Avon S411 (1970), Berkley (1978) , Star (1982) , Warner (1986)  
The Masks of Time Ballantine U6121 (1968), Berkley (1978) , Bantam (1983) , Gollancz (2002)   Nebula nominee, 1968 
The Man in the Maze Avon V2262 (1969), Avon (1975) , Star (1982) , Avon (1983) , ibooks (2005) 
Nightwings Avon V2303 (1969), Sphere (1974) , Avon (1976) , ibooks (2003) . Incorporates the title novella, which won the Hugo Award in 1969 
Across a Billion Years Dial (1969), Magnum (1979) , Tor (1983) 
Three Survived (1969) 
To Live Again Doubleday (1969), Dell 8973 (1971) Berkley (1978) , Warner (1986) 
Up the Line Ballantine 01680 (1969), Sphere (1978) , Ballantine (1981) , ibooks (2002) . Nebula Award nominee, 1969; Hugo Award nominee, 1970 
Downward to the Earth serialized in Galaxy (1970), Signet T4497 (1971), Pan (1978) , Berkley (1979) , Bantam (1984) , Gollancz (1990)  Orb (2012) . Locus SF nominated, 1971 
Tower of Glass serialized in Galaxy (1970), Charles Scribner's Sons (1970), Bantam S6902 (1971), Panther (1976)  (1971), Bantam (1983) , Warner (1989) , Gollancz (2001) . Nebula Award nominee, 1970; Hugo and Locus SF nominee, 1971 
Son of Man Ballantine (1971) , Panther (1979) , Warner (1987) , Pyr (2008) .
The Second Trip Signet Q5402 (1971), Gollancz (1979) , Pan (1980) , Avon (1981) 
The World Inside Doubleday (1971), Signet Q5176 (1972), Panther (1978) , Bantam (1983) , ibooks (2004) , Orb (2010) . Hugo nominated, 1972
A Time of Changes Serialized in Galaxy (1971),  Signet Q4729 (1971), Panther (1975) , Berkley (1979) , Warner (1986) , Orb (2009)  Silverberg's first Nebula winner, 1972; Hugo and Locus SF nominee, 1972
The Book of Skulls Charles Scribner's Sons (1971), Signet Q5177 (1972), Gollancz (1978) , New English Library (1987) , Gollancz (2000) , Del Rey (2006) . Nebula Award nominee, 1972; Hugo and Locus SF Award nominee, 1973
Dying Inside Serialized in Galaxy (1972),  Charles Scribner's Sons (1972) , Ballantine (1972) , Bantam (1984) , Gollancz (1989) , ibooks (2002) , Orb (2009) 978-0-765-32230-2. Nebula Award nominee, 1972; Hugo and Locus SF Awards nominee, 1973
The Stochastic Man Harper & Row (1975) , Fawcett (1976) , Coronet (1978) , Gollancz (2001) . Nebula Award nominee, 1975; Hugo, Locus SF, and John W. Campbell Memorial Awards nominee, 1976
Shadrach in the Furnace Bobbs-Merrill Company (1976) , Pocket (1978) , Coronet (1979) . Nebula nominee, 1976 Hugo nominee, 1977
Homefaring (1982), novella, Hugo and Nebula nominee, 1983
Lord of Darkness Arbor House (1983) , Bantam (1984)  
Sailing to Byzantium (1985) (novella), Nebula winner 1986
Tom O'Bedlam Donald I. Fine (1985) , Warner (1986) , Orbit (1987) 
Star of Gypsies  Donald I. Fine (1986) , Popular Questar (1988) , Orbit (1988) , Pyr (2005) 
Project Pendulum Walker (1987) , Bantam (1989) 
Letters From Atlantis Atheneum (1990) , Questar (1992) , novella
Nightfall Doubleday (1990) , Pan (1991) , Bantam (1991) . Silverberg and Isaac Asimov – expansion of the 1941 novelette "Nightfall" by Asimov 
Thebes of the Hundred Gates (1991), novella
The Face of the Waters Bantam (1991) , Grafton (1991) , Bantam (1992) 
 Child of Time Gollancz (1991) ; US edition, The Ugly Little Boy Doubleday (1992) , Silverberg with Asimov – expansion and revision of the 1958 novelette "Lastborn" by Asimov
Kingdoms of the Wall HarperCollins (1992) , Bantam (1993) 
The Positronic Man Gollancz (1992) , Doubleday (1993) , with Isaac Asimov, based on the 1976 novelette The Bicentennial Man by Asimov
Hot Sky at Midnight Bantam (1994) , HarperCollins (1994) , Bantam (1995) 
Starborne Bantam (1996) , Voyager (1996) , Bantam (1997) 
The Alien Years Harper (1998) . Locus SF nominee, 1999
The Longest Way Home Gollancz (2002) 
Roma Eterna Eos (2003) , Gollancz (2003) , Eos (2004) 
The Last Song of Orpheus (2010), novella

Short story collections

Next Stop, the Stars Ace F-145 (1962) 
Godling, Go Home Belmont (1964)
Needle in a Timestack Ballantine U2330 (1966) 
The Calibrated Alligator Holt, Rinehart and Winston(1969) 
Dimension Thirteen Ballantine 01601(1969) 
The Cube Root of Uncertainty Macmillan (1970), Collier (1971)
Parsecs and Parables Doubleday (1973)
Moonferns & Starsongs Ballantine (1971) 
The Reality Trip and Other Implausibilities Ballantine (1972) 
Valley Beyond Time Dell (1973)
Earth's Other Shadow Signet (1973) 
Unfamiliar Territory Charles Scribner's Sons (1973), Gollancz (1975), Berkley (1978) 
The Feast of St. Dionysus: Five Science Fiction Stories Charles Scribner's Sons (1975) 
Sunrise on Mercury  Thomas Nelson (1975), Gollancz (1983) 
Capricorn Games Random House (1976), Pan (1979), Starblaze (1979) 
The Best of Robert Silverberg Pocket (1976)
The Shores of Tomorrow  Thomas Nelson (1976) 
World of a Thousand Colors Arbor House (1982) 
 Majipoor series:
 1.2. Majipoor Chronicles Arbor House (1982) , Gollancz (1982) , Bantam (1983) , Pan (1983) , collection of 5 short stories and 5 novelettes/novellas:
 "Thesme and the Ghayrog" (novelette), "The Time of the Burning", "In the Fifth Year of the Voyage" (novelette), "Calintane Explains", "The Desert of Stolen Dreams" (novella), "The Soul Painter and the Shapeshifter" (novelette), "Crime and Punishment", "Among the Dream-Speakers", "A Thief in Ni-Moya" (novella), "Voriax and Valentine"
 4. Tales of Majipoor Gollancz (2013) , Roc (2013) , collection of 7  novelettes/novellas:
 "The End of the Line" (novelette), "The Book of Changes" (novella), "The Tomb of the Pontifex Dvorn" (novelette), "The Sorcerer's Apprentice" (novelette), "Dark Times at the Midnight Market" (novelette), "The Way They Wove the Spells in Sippulgar" (novelette), "The Seventh Shrine" (novella)
The Conglomeroid Cocktail Party Arbor House (1984) 
Beyond the Safe Zone Donald I. Fine (1986) 
 Pluto in the Morning Light (The Collected Stories of Robert Silverberg Volume 1)  Grafton (1992) 
The Collected Stories of Robert Silverberg: Secret Sharers Bantam (1992) 
Phases of the Moon Subterranean Press (2004), ibooks (2004) 
In the Beginning: Tales from the Pulp Era (2006) 
To Be Continued: The Collected Stories Volume 1 Subterranean Press (2006) 
To the Dark Star: The Collected Stories Volume 2 Subterranean Press (2007) 
A Little Intelligence (with Randall Garrett) (Crippen & Landru, 2009) 
Something Wild Is Loose: The Collected Stories Volume 3 Subterranean Press (2008) 
Trips: The Collected Stories Volume 4 Subterranean Press (2009) 
The Palace at Midnight: The Collected Stories Volume 5 Subterranean Press (2010) 
Multiples: The Collected Stories Volume 6 Subterranean Press (2011) 
We Are for the Dark: The Collected Stories Volume 7 Subterranean Press (2012) 
Hot Times in Magma City: The Collected Stories Volume 8 Subterranean Press (2013) 
The Millennium Express: The Collected Stories Volume 9 Subterranean Press (2014)

Anthologies edited

The Science Fiction Hall of Fame
The Science Fiction Hall of Fame, Volume One, 1929–1964 (1970) 
The Science Fiction Hall of Fame, Volume Two (1973)

Alpha
Alpha 1 (1970) 
Alpha 2 (1971) 
Alpha 3 (1972) 
Alpha 4 (1973) 
Alpha 5 (1974) 
Alpha 6 (1976) 
Alpha 7 (1977) 
Alpha 8 (1977) 
Alpha 9 (1978)

New Dimensions
New Dimensions 1 (1971)
New Dimensions II (1972) 
New Dimensions 3 (1973)
New Dimensions IV (1974)
New Dimensions Science Fiction 5 (1975) 
New Dimensions Science Fiction 6 (1976) 
New Dimensions Science Fiction 7 (1977) 
New Dimensions Science Fiction 8 (1978)
New Dimensions Science Fiction 9 (1979)
New Dimensions Science Fiction 10 (1980)
New Dimensions 11 (1980) (with Marta Randall)
New Dimensions 12 (1981) (with Marta Randall)

Nebula Award anthologies
The Nebula Awards #18 (1983)
Nebula Awards Showcase 2001 (2001)

Universe anthologies (with Karen Haber)
Universe 1 (1990)
Universe 2 (1992)
Universe 3 (1994)

Legends
Legends (1998)
Legends II (2003)

Others
Earthmen & Strangers (1966)
Terrestres e estranhos (1968), Portuguese version of Earthmen & Strangers including new Portuguese scifi texts organized by Portuguese writer and publisher Lima Rodrigues
Men and Machines (1968)
Voyagers in Time (1967)
How It Was When the Past Went Away (1969) in: Three For Tomorrow (3 short stories by Silverberg, Roger Zelazny, James Blish, foreword Arthur C. Clarke) (1970, Victor Gollancz; 1972, Sphere Books, p. 11-80)
Deep Space: Eight Stories of Science Fiction (1973)
Infinite Jests:  The Lighter Side of Science Fiction (1974)
Mutants (1974)
Epoch (with Roger Elwood) (1975)
Strange Gifts (1975)
Dawn of Time (with Martin H. Greenberg and Joseph Olander) (1979)
The Edge of Space (1979)
The Best of Randall Garrett (1982)
The Fantasy Hall of Fame (with Martin H. Greenberg) (1983)
The Fantasy Hall of Fame (1998)
Far Horizons (1999)
Robert Silverberg Presents the Great SF Stories: 1964 (with Martin H. Greenberg) (2001)
Tales from Super-Science Fiction (2011)
Times Three  (2011)

Non-fiction

For adults
 
 
The Great Wall of China (1965)
Leaders Of Labor (1966, as Roy Cook)
Kublai Khan: Lord of Xanadu (1966, as Walker Chapman)
The Loneliest Continent: The Story of Antarctic Discovery (1964, as Walker Chapman)
Antarctic Conquest: The Great Explorers in Their Own Words (1966, as Walker Chapman)
The Golden Dream: Seekers of El Dorado (1967, as Walker Chapman)
Sophisticated Sex Techniques in Marriage (1967, as L. T. Woodward)
Mound Builders of Ancient America: The Archeology of a Myth (New York Graphic Society, 1968); Silverberg's fourth-most widely held work in WorldCat libraries
The Realm of Prester John (1972)
Drug Themes in Science Fiction (1974)
Reflections and Refractions: Thoughts on Science Fiction, Science and Other Matters (1997; revised & expanded edition 2016)
Musings and Meditations (2011)

For children
 
 
 
 
 
 
 
 
 
 
 
Man Before Adam: The Story of Man in Search of His Origins (1964)
Akhnaten: The Rebel Pharaoh (1964)
1066 (1964, as Franklin Hamilton)
The Man Who Found Nineveh: The Story of Austen Henry Layard (1964)
Great Adventures in Archaeology (1964)
Socrates (1965)
Scientists And Scoundrels: A Book of Hoaxes (1965)
Men Who Mastered the Atom (1965)
Niels Bohr: The Man Who Mapped the Atom (1965)
The Old Ones: Indians of the American Southwest (1965)
The World of Coral (1965)
The Crusades (1965, as Franklin Hamilton)
The Long Rampart: The Story of the Great Wall of China (1966)
Rivers: A Book to Begin On (1966, as Lee Sebastian)
Forgotten by Time: A Book of Living Fossils (1966)
Frontiers in Archeology (1966)
Bridges (1966)
To the Rock of Darius: The Story of Henry Rawlinson (1966)
The Hopefuls: Ten Presidential Campaigns (1966, as Lloyd Robinson)
The Morning of Mankind: Prehistoric Man in Europe (1967)
The Auk, the Dodo and the Oryx (1967)
The World of the Rain Forests (1967)
The Dawn of Medicine (1967)
The Adventures of Nat Palmer (1967)
Challenge for a Throne: The Wars of the Roses (1967, as Franklin Hamilton)
Men Against Time: Salvage Archeology in the United States (1967)
Light for the World: Edison and the Power Industry (1967)
The Search for Eldorado (1967, as Walker Chapman)
The World of the Ocean Depths (1968)
The Stolen Election: Hayes vs. Tilden, 1876 (1968, as Lloyd Robinson)
Four Men Who Changed the Universe (1968)
Sam Houston (1968, as Paul Hollander)
The South Pole: A Book to Begin On (1968, as Lee Sebastian)
Stormy Voyager (1968)
Ghost Towns of the American West (1968)
Vanishing Giants: The Story of the Sequoias (1969)
Wonders of Ancient Chinese Science (1969)
The Challenge of Climate: Man and His Environment (1969)
Bruce of the Blue Nile (1969)
The World of Space (1969)
If I Forget Thee, O Jerusalem (1970)
The Seven Wonders of the Ancient World (1970)
Mammoths, Mastodons and Man (1970)
The Mound Builders (1970, abridged version of Mound Builders of Ancient America (1968) for children); Reprint (Ohio University Press, 1986)
The Pueblo Revolt (1970)
Clocks for the Ages: How Scientists Date the Past (1971)
To The Western Shore: Growth of the United States 1776-1853 (1971)
Before The Sphinx: Early Egypt (1971)
Into Space: A Young Person's Guide to Space (1971, with Arthur C. Clarke)
The Longest Voyage: Circumnavigation in the Age Of Discovery (1972)
John Muir, Prophet Among the Glaciers (1972)
The World Within the Ocean Wave (1972)
The World Within the Tide Pool (1972)

Reflections columns in Asimov's Science Fiction

Notes

Bibliographies by writer
Bibliographies of American writers
Science fiction bibliographies